Adrian Morejón Garcia (born February 27, 1999) is a Cuban professional baseball pitcher for the San Diego Padres of Major League Baseball (MLB). He made his MLB debut in 2019.

Career

Cuban career
Morejón played for the Cuban national baseball team in the 2014 15U Baseball World Cup, and was named the tournament's most valuable player. He appeared in the Cuban National Series for the Huracanes de Mayabeque that year.

Morejón defected from Cuba in October 2015. He relocated to the Dominican Republic and was declared a free agent by Major League Baseball in July 2016.

San Diego Padres

Morejón signed a minor league contract with the San Diego Padres, receiving a $11 million signing bonus, in July 2016. He made his professional debut in 2017, spending time with both the Tri-City Dust Devils and the Fort Wayne TinCaps, posting a combined 3–4 win–loss record with a  3.86 earned run average (ERA) in 13 starts between both clubs. He spent 2018 with the Lake Elsinore Storm, going 4–4 with a 3.30 ERA in 13 starts. He began 2019 with the Amarillo Sod Poodles. Morejón was named to the 2019 All-Star Futures Game.

On July 21, 2019, the Padres selected Morejón's contract and promoted him to the major leagues. He made his major league debut that day versus the Chicago Cubs. In 2020, Morejón pitched to a 2–2 record and 4.66 ERA with 25 strikeouts in  innings across nine games (four games started).

Morejón departed from a game started on April 11, 2021, against the Texas Rangers after suffering a left forearm strain. On April 20, it was announced that Morejón would undergo Tommy John surgery and miss the remainder of the 2021 season. On April 23, Morejón was placed on the 60-day injured list.

After rehabilitating from his surgery, Morejón returned to the Padres active roster in June 2022.

On January 13, 2023, Morejón agreed to a one-year, $800K contract with the Padres, avoiding salary arbitration.

See also

 List of baseball players who defected from Cuba
 List of Major League Baseball players from Cuba

References

External links

1999 births
Living people
Amarillo Sod Poodles players
Arizona League Padres players
Defecting Cuban baseball players
El Paso Chihuahuas players
Fort Wayne TinCaps players
Lake Elsinore Storm players
Major League Baseball pitchers
Major League Baseball players from Cuba
Cuban expatriate baseball players in the United States
San Antonio Missions players
San Diego Padres players
Tri-City Dust Devils players
Baseball players from Havana